This article lists the election results of the Green Party of England and Wales (and its predecessors) in the UK parliamentary, European parliamentary, London Assembly, and Senedd elections.

Westminster elections

Summary performance

General election 2010

The 2010 general election was a milestone for the Green Party as party leader Caroline Lucas was elected Britain's first Green MP in Brighton Pavilion with 31.3% of the vote. The Green Party fielded 310 candidates, six of whom saved their deposits. Green candidates came 4th in Norwich South, Hove, Brighton Kemptown, Cambridge and Lewisham Deptford. Overall the Green party received 1.0% of votes in the General election.

General election 2015
The Green Party stood in 571 seats across the UK in the 2015 general election. They held Brighton Pavilion and came second in Bristol West, Liverpool Riverside, Manchester Gorton and Sheffield Central, with third places in 17 constituencies.

It was the first time the party garnered more than one million votes in a general election. Deposits were saved in 123 constituencies, where the Green candidate collected at least 5% of the votes cast.

General election 2017
In the 2017 general election, Green candidates stood in 457 seats across the UK, standing down in some seats to enable tactical voting.

Deposits were saved in 8 seats: Brighton Pavilion (seat held), Isle of Wight, Buckingham, Bristol West, Sheffield Central, Skipton & Ripon, North Herefordshire and North East Hertfordshire (their sister party, the Scottish Green Party, also saved one deposit in Glasgow North). This was down from 123 saved deposits in 2015. The party lost over half its vote compared to 2015, falling from 1,156,149 votes (3.8%) to 524,604 (1.6%). The party also saw significant declines in its share of the vote in target seats, such as in Bristol West (-13.9%), Norwich South (-11%), and Sheffield Central (-7.8%). It also fell behind Labour in the Isle of Wight. In total, the Green vote fell in 561 constituencies, and rose in 22.

General election 2019
In the 2019 general election, Green candidates stood in 469 seats across England and Wales, standing down in several seats to enable tactical voting, including 50 constituencies as part of the Unite to Remain campaign. Deposits were saved in 29 seats, up from the eight saved in the 2017 election. As well as holding the seat of Brighton Pavilion, the party came second in two seats (Bristol West and Dulwich and West Norwood) and third in 12 constituencies.

By-elections
The party came second in the 2008 Haltemprice and Howden by-election, although unusually Labour and the Liberal Democrats did not stand candidates.

The Richmond Green Party voted against standing in the 2016 Richmond Park by-election and to back the Liberal Democrat candidate. On 3 November, the Kingston Green Party did the same, and confirmed that there would not be a Green Party candidate in the by-election.

The Party stated that following the murder of the incumbent MP Jo Cox that, as a mark of respect, that it would not contest the 2016 Batley and Spen by-election. Similarly, following the murder of the incumbent MP David Amess, the Green Party stated that it would not contest the 2022 Southend West by-election.

European Parliament elections

Summary performance

European Parliament election 2009

In the June 2009 European Parliament election the party secured 1,223,303 votes or 7.8% of the popular vote compared to its 2004 vote share of 5.6%. Green MEPs Caroline Lucas in the South East and Jean Lambert in London were re-elected. The Greens came first in Norwich with 25%, Oxford with 26% and Brighton and Hove with 31%, but it failed to gain any extra MEPs.

The regional breakdown of the vote was as follows:

European Parliament election 2014

In the 2014 election, the Greens gained a seat for the first time since 1999, with Molly Scott Cato being elected as MEP for South West England, where the party's vote share rose by 1.8%. However, the party's vote fell in every other region, and there was media speculation that the party had only gained a seat in the South West as a result of An Independence from Europe dividing the UK Independence Party vote.

The regional breakdown of the vote was as follows:

European Parliament election 2019

London local elections

London Assembly elections

London Mayoral elections

Wales Green Party election results

Welsh Assembly/Senedd elections

2021

2016

In September 2015 Amelia Womack, Deputy Leader of GPEW, announced her intention to stand in the National Assembly elections for Wales Green Party. Wales Green Party who create their own set of devolved policies around devolved issues in Wales were hopeful of gaining three Assembly seats from the proportional representation lists in the 2016 elections. In the event, they won none, their vote share fell by 0.4%, and the party dropped to seventh place, behind the single-issue Abolish the Welsh Assembly Party. It was the party's worst result since 1999.

2011
The Wales Green Party again fielded candidates in all 5 top-up regions for the 2011 election. For the first time since 1999, the Greens also stood in a constituency - they once again opted to stand in Ceredigion.

During the 2011 campaign, they specifically targeted Labour voters with the aim of persuading them to use their regional list vote for the Greens, using the slogan "2nd vote Green". They claimed that Labour list votes were "wasted" and that over 70,000 votes in South Wales Central went "in the bin at every election" as Labour had never won a top-up seat in that region.

On this occasion, South Wales Central was the region the party targeted. The region includes Cardiff, with its large student population, and also the constituency of Cardiff Central, the only Liberal Democrat-Labour marginal seat in Wales. Welsh Green leader and South Wales Central candidate Jake Griffiths stated they were also aiming to attract disaffected Liberal Democrat voters in the region.

The Greens polled 32,649 votes, 3.4% of the total votes cast for the regional lists. In South Wales Central, they took over 10,000 votes, 5.2% of the total, though they were still almost 6,000 votes away from winning a seat. The regional results were as follows:

In Ceredigion, Chris Simpson polled 1,514 votes, or 5.2%. He came fifth out of five candidates.

2007
In 2007, the party again fielded a list of candidates in each of the top-up regions but no candidates for the constituencies. The Wales Green Party proposed that Wales should "be at the forefront of....a green industrial revolution". The party targeted South Wales West - the region where they had performed best in 2003.

The Welsh Greens polled 33,803 votes, or 3.5% of the total, a slight decrease on 2003. The party failed to win any seats, with their best performance this time being Mid and West Wales with 4.0% of the vote. In South Wales West their vote declined by one percentage point, their worst result of the five regions.

2003
In the 2003 election, the party again fielded a list of candidates for each of the electoral regions but this time stood no candidates for the constituencies. The Welsh Greens failed to win any seats, polling 30,028 votes, or 3.5%. Their best performance was in South Wales West where they polled 6,696 votes, or 4.8% of the total.

1999
In the 1999 inaugural election for the National Assembly, the Welsh Greens stood candidates in all five electoral regions used to elect "top-up" members of the assembly. Additionally, one candidate stood for the constituency seat of Ceredigion. The party stated that they aimed to poll around 7% of the vote and win at least one top-up seat.

The Welsh Greens ultimately polled 25,858 votes in the regional lists, 2.5% of the total, and 1,002 constituency votes (3.1%) in Ceredigion. No Welsh Greens were elected.

UK Parliament elections
2015
In the 2015 UK general election, the Wales Green Party again failed to gain any MPs, but did retain their deposits in three constituencies, having achieved 5% or more of the vote. The party stood candidates in 35 of the 40 constituencies in Wales, far exceeding previous efforts. Leader at the time, Pippa Bartolotti, declared 2015 a 'record breaking year' for the party. The results for the party's candidates in Wales, in alphabetical order of constituency, were as follows:

2010
In the 2010 UK general election, the Wales Green Party again failed to gain any MPs. The results for the party's candidates in Wales, in alphabetical order of constituency, were as follows:

2005
In the 2005 UK general election, the Wales Green Party failed to gain any MPs or retain any deposits. The results for the party's candidates in Wales, in alphabetical order of constituency, were as follows:

European Parliament elections
2014
The Wales Green Party nominated four candidates for the European Parliament election, 2014.
Pippa Bartolotti
John Matthews
Roz Cutler
Christopher Were

2009
In the 2009 European Parliament election in the United Kingdom, the Welsh party failed to gain any seats in the European Parliament, but increased the vote to 5.6% for the four Welsh seats.

2004
In the 2004 elections, the Welsh party failed to gain any seats in the European Parliament (with 3.6% of the vote for the four Welsh seats) and lost their only county council seat (of Klaus Armstrong-Braun in Flintshire).

References

elections
Election results by party in the United Kingdom